The National Legislative Assembly of Thailand was an appointed body, acting as the National Assembly of Thailand after the 2006 Coup d’etat. It was established by the military junta under General Sonthi Boonyaratglin which took the name of "Council for Democratic Reform under the Constitutional Monarchy" (CDR) and ceased to function at the end of 2007 when it was replaced by the new, elected National Assembly. The Constitution Drafting Assembly was also formed by the junta to prepare a new constitution.

Composition
The NLA had 242 members appointed by the king, representing different sectors of the society and occupational groups. 21 of the NLA members were women.

 State sector
 17 civil servants of the highest ranks (paygrades C-11 and up)
 12 other civil servants, judges and state's attorneys
 41 military officers
 7 police officers
 8 managers and personnel of state-owned enterprises
 Private sector
 6 managers of banks and financial institutions
 19 representatives of commerce, industry, services, transport, building and real estate business
 11 representatives of other businesses
 7 legal advisers and attorneys
 Social sector
 4 representatives of political parties
 11 scholars of philosophy, languages, religion, arts and culture
 20 journalists, writers and artists
 43 retired public servants and other experienced persons
 13 activists in local development, promotion of morality, labour organisations, and non-profit organisations
 Academic sector
 29 rectors, professors, students, researchers, and other academics

References

Government of Thailand
2006 Thai coup d'état